Zygana once was a bishopric in Lazica, Georgia and remains a Latin Catholic titular see.

Ecclesiastical history 
Its location was modern Cobuleti. It was presumably a suffragan of the Archdiocese of Phasis (Fasi, modern Poti). No residential incumbents available, nor a date of suppression.

In 1933 it was nominally restored as Latin Catholic Titular bishopric of Zygana (Latin) / Zigana (Curiate Italian) / Zyganen(sis) (Latin adjective).
 
It is of the Episcopal (lowest) rank, but has had no incumbent yet.

See also 
 Zigana, (notably Turkish) namesakes

Sources and external links 
 GCatholic

Catholic titular sees in Europe